Mill Creek is a stream in the U.S. state of Wisconsin. It is a tributary to the Wisconsin River.

Mill Creek was named for the sawmills which once lined its banks. The native Chippewa-language name was Wau-pee-tee Se-be meaning "tooth river".

References

Rivers of Portage County, Wisconsin
Rivers of Wood County, Wisconsin
Rivers of Wisconsin